Brazil is scheduled to compete in the 2023 Pan American Games in Santiago, Chile from October 20 to November 5, 2023.

Competitors
The following is the list of number of competitors (per gender) participating at the games per sport/discipline.

Archery

Brazil qualified eight archers during the 2022 Pan American Archery Championships.

Men

Women

Mixed

Artistic swimming

Brazi qualified a full team of nine artistic swimmers after winning the competition in the 2022 South American Games.

Baseball

Brazil qualified a men's team (of 24 athletes) by winning the 2022 South American Baseball Championship.

Summary

Basketball

5x5

Men's tournament

Brazil qualified a men's team (of 12 athletes) by finishing second in the 2022 FIBA Americup.

Summary

3x3

Men's tournament

Brazil qualified a men's team (of 4 athletes) by finishing third in the 2022 FIBA 3x3 AmeriCup.
Summary

Women's tournament

Brazil qualified a women's team (of 4 athletes) by finishing second in the 2022 FIBA 3x3 AmeriCup.
Summary

Bowling

Brazil qualified a full team of two men and two women through the 2022 PABCON Champion of Champions held in Rio de Janeiro, Brazil.

Boxing

Brazil qualified nine boxers (five men and four women) by reaching the final of the 2022 South American Games.

Men

Women

Canoeing

Sprint
Brazil qualified a total of 7 sprint athletes (five men and two women).

Men

Women

Cycling

BMX racing
Brazil qualified four cyclists (two men and two women) in BMX race through the UCI World Rankings.

Racing

Mountain bike
Brazil qualified 2 athletes in Mountain Bike by winning the cross-country competition in the two genders in the 2022 South American Games.

Diving 

Brazil qualified four athletes (two men and two women) by finishing among the top 18 athletes of the respective events in the 2022 World Aquatics Championships.

 Men

 Women

Equestrian

Brazil qualified a full team of 12 equestrians (four in Dressage, Eventing and Jumping).

Dressage

Eventing

Jumping

Fencing

Brazil qualified a full team of 18 fencers (nine men and nine women), after all six teams finished at least in the top seven at the 2022 Pan American Fencing Championships in Asuncion, Paraguay. Besides, Brazil qualified 1 extra fencer to the Women Épée Individual Event after winning the 2021 Junior Pan American Games individual event.

Individual
Men

Women

Team

Field hockey

Men's tournament

Brazil qualified a men's team of 16 athletes by finishing 6th at the 2022 Pan American Cup. 

Summary

Football

Men's tournament

Brazil qualified a men's team of 18 athletes by virtue of its campaign in the 2023 South American U-20 Championship.

Summary

Handball

Men's tournament

Brazil qualified a men's team (of 14 athletes) by winning the 2021 Junior Pan American Games.

Summary

Women's tournament

Brazil qualified a women's team (of 14 athletes) by winning the 2022 South American Games. 

Summary

Judo

Brazil has qualified five judokas (two men and three women) after winning the categories at the 2021 Junior Pan American Games.

Men

Women

Karate

Brazil qualified a team of 6 karatekas (three men and three women) in the 2022 South American Games. Besides, Brazil qualified 2 extra karatekas after winning each category during the 2021 Junior Pan American Games.

Kumite 

Kata

Modern pentathlon

Brazil qualified six modern pentathletes (three men and three women).

Roller sports

Figure
Brazil qualified a team of two athletes in figure skating (one man and one woman).

Speed
Brazil qualified one male athlete in speed skating after winning the 2021 Junior Pan American Games.

Skateboarding
Brazil qualified a team of two athletes in skateboarding after winning the 2021 Junior Pan American Games.

Men

Women

Rugby sevens

Men's tournament

Brazil qualified a men's team (of 12 athletes) at the 2022 Sudamérica Rugby Sevens.

Summary

Women's tournament

Brazil qualified a women's team (of 12 athletes) by winning the Women's competition at the 2022 Sudamérica Rugby Women's Sevens.

Summary

Sailing

Brazil has qualified 7 boats for a total of 11 sailors.

Men

Women

Mixed

Shooting

Brazil qualified a total of 15 shooters in the 2022 Americas Shooting Championships. Brazil also qualified three shooters during the 2022 South American Games.

Men
Pistol and rifle

Men
Shotgun

Women
Pistol and rifle

Women
Shotgun

Surfing

Brazil qualified four surfers (two men and two women).

Artistic

Race

Swimming

Brazil qualified 2 female swimmers to the Open Water event during the 2022 South American Games.  Brazil also qualified 10 swimmers by winning events at the 2021 Junior Pan American Games. 

Men

Women

Table tennis

Brazil qualified a full team of six athletes (three men and three women) through the 2022 ITTF Pan American Championships. 
 
Men

Women

Mixed

Taekwondo

Brazil has qualified a female athlete at a Kyorugi event, by virtue of her title in the 2021 Junior Pan American Games. 

Kyorugi

Women

Tennis

Brazil qualified one male athlete after reaching the final of the singles tournament in the 2022 South American Games.

Men

Triathlon

Brazilian triathlete Miguel Hidalgo achieved an individual spot after winning the individual competition in the 2021 Junior Pan American Games.
Brazil qualified a team of four triathletes (two men and two women) after winning the mixed relay competition in the 2022 South American Games.

Mixed relay

Volleyball

Beach

Brazil qualified a men's and women's pair for a total of four athletes by winning the 2021 Junior Pan American Games.

Indoor

Men's tournament

Brazil qualified a men's team (of 12 athletes) by winning the 2021 Junior Pan American Games.

Summary

Women's tournament

Brazil qualified a women's team (of 12 athletes) by winning the 2021 Junior Pan American Games.

Summary

Water polo

Men's tournament

Brazil qualified a men's team (of 11 athletes) by winning the 2022 South American Games.

Summary

Women's tournament

Brazil qualified a women's team (of 11 athletes) by winning the 2022 South American Games.

Summary

Water skiing

Brazil qualified two wakeboarders (one of each gender) during the 2022 Pan American Championship.

Men

Women

Weightlifting

Brazil qualified seven weightlifters (three men and four women) after the 2021 and 2022 editions of the Pan American Weightlifting Championships.

 Men

 Women

Wrestling

Brazil qualified seven wrestlers (Men's Freestyle: 74 kg), (Greco-Roman: 67 kg, 77 kg and 130 kg), (Women's Freestyle: 57 kg, 62 kg and 68 kg) through the 2022 Pan American Wrestling Championships held in Acapulco, Mexico.      Brazil also qualified one wrestler (Greco-Roman: 97 kg) by winning the 2021 Junior Pan American Games. 

Men

Women

See also
Brazil at the 2023 Parapan American Games
Brazil at the 2024 Summer Olympics

References

Nations at the 2023 Pan American Games
2023
2023 in Brazilian sport